FC Bakhmaro is a Georgian association football club based in Chokhatauri. The club currently competes in Liga 3, the third tier of Georgian football system.

History
FC Bakhmaro have never participated in top divisions.

In 1990s they took part in the second league for several seasons and in mid-2010s the club mostly played in the third division, where they usually stayed in top half of the table.

Despite coming 2nd in their group in 2016, Bakhmaro left the third tier in view of reorganization of the entire league system, which meant relegation for a vast majority of clubs. It took the team a year to win the Regional league tournament, the then forth division, and return to Liga 3.

The next year the club had quite a memorable season. During the entire campaign up until the last matchday they were engaged in a fierce rivalry with Zugdidi for the first place. Eventually, as runners-up, Bakhmaro booked a place in promotion play-offs against FC Tskhinvali, although suffered a defeat in both games. 

In 2019, the club yet again narrowly fell short of the promotion goal and since then switched to survival tasks. An awful run of form at the beginning of the next season brought Bakhmaro to the brink of relegation, although they stayed up only after some changes regarding the number of clubs were introduced in January 2021. 

Likewise, in 2021 with one win in the initial ten matches the team hurtled towards the drop zone, which led to the replacement of manager. This time, though, they gradually improved the performance on the pitch and drifted to safety.

Seasons

Players
As of April 2022

 (C)

Managers
 Teimuraz Loria (2017 - July 2019)

 Khariton Chkhatarashvili  (July 2019 - May 2021)

 Paata Metreveli (May – December 2021) 

 Teimuraz Loria (since February 2022)

The current manager had spent several years as manager at Guria Lanchkhuti. His name is attributed to the club's successful seasons in 2017 and 2018. Most recently he was in charge of Chibati Lanchkhuti.

Stadium
The home of FC Bakhmaro is a stadium with the capacity of 2 000 seats, which is named after Boris Paichadze, the distinguished Georgian football player born in Chokhatauri. The stadium complex currently consists of two football pitches and a rugby playing field.

Name
Bakhmaro is a famous alpine resort in Chokhatauri municipality of Guria.

References

External links
Profile on Soccerway

 Facebook page

Bakhmaro
Association football clubs established in 1950